Liberation Music is an Australian record company and label, started in 1999 by Michael Gudinski and Warren Costello, based in Melbourne. Its stated aim is to find, nurture and then to develop new talent for a world market while remaining independent in the process.

Liberation has a sub-label called Liberator Music, which is a distributor for foreign artists and labels such as Childish Gambino, Glassnote Records, BMG Rights Management, and Ipecac Recordings.

History 
Following the 1998 sale of Gudinski's Mushroom Records to Festival Records, Liberation Music was formed to continue to satisfy Michael Gudinski's desire to promote and develop Australian Music. Effective September 2008, Liberation is distributed by Universal Music Australia after leaving Warner Music Australia.

In September 2017, Liberation Music re-branded as Liberation Records. The Mushroom Group's newest imprint, Bloodlines, is now home to several artists previously signed to Liberation Music.

Artists

Current label artists

 Adalita
 British India
 D.D Dumbo
 Dan Sultan
 Emma Louise
 Gordi
 Husky
 Josef Salvat
 Julia Jacklin
 R.W. Grace
 Seeker Lover Keeper
 The Temper Trap
 Vance Joy

Past label artists
 Custom Kings
 Little Red
 Melody Pool
 Snakadaktal
 The Holidays
 TZU
 World's End Press

References 

Australian record labels
Labels distributed by Universal Music Group
Record labels established in 1999
1999 establishments in Australia
Record labels based in Melbourne